Bramble is a surname. Notable people with the surname include:

Alexander Bramble (born 1984), Montserratian footballer
Anthony Bramble (born 1990), Guyanese cricketer
A.V. Bramble (1884–1963) British actor and film director
Curt Bramble, American politician and Certified Public Accountant from Utah
Downer T. Bramble (1832–1887), American pioneer businessman and politician
Eldon Bramble (1931–1977), Vincentian cricketer 
Fitzgerald Bramble (born 1967), Saint Vincent and the Grenadines politician and footballer
James H. Bramble (1930–2021), American mathematician
Kevin Bramble (born 1972), American disabled ski racer, freeskier, and monoski designer
Lachlan Bramble (born 1998), professional Australian rules footballer 
Livingstone Bramble or Ras-I Alujah Bramble (born 1960), Kittian and Nevisian boxer
Mark Bramble (1950–2019), American theatre director, author and producer
Percival Austin Bramble (born 1931), Montserratian politician
Tesfaye Bramble, English-born Montserratian footballer
Titus Bramble (born 1981), English premier league footballer
TJ Bramble (born 2001)  English-born Antiguan footballer 
Todd Bramble (born 1967), American soccer coach
Tom Bramble, Australian socialist activist, author and retired academic
William Henry Bramble (1901–1988), Montserratian politician

See also 

 Bramble (disambiguation)
 Brambell

English-language surnames